Construction is the process of producing buildings and other infrastructure.

Construction also may refer to:

 Additional physical/mechanical senses:
 Offshore construction, the installation of structures in marine environments
 Primarily abstract senses of creation or assembly:
 (A list of) algebraic constructions
 Compass and straightedge constructions in geometry
 Grammatical construction, meaning-bearing relationship among words of an utterance
 Construction (Cage), music by John Cage
 Construction (Egyptian coalition), for political purposes 
 Construction as synonym for "act of construing":
 Statutory construction in law
Judicial interpretation of legal terms
 Social construction, social factors in construing of language and other symbols
 Construals
 Building (Australian magazine), subsequently published under the title Construction

See also 
 On Construction, books XVII & XVIII of Priscian's Institutions of Grammar
 Index of construction articles
 Construct (disambiguation)
 Constructionism (disambiguation)
 Constructivism (disambiguation)
 Constructor (disambiguation)
 Reconstruction (disambiguation)